Peter Schaefer may refer to:

 Peter Schaefer (ice hockey) (born 1977), Canadian retired professional ice hockey player
 Peter Schaefer (author) (born 1943), German scholar of ancient religious studies and director of the Jewish Museum of Berlin

See also 
 Peter Schäfer, German historian of religion
 Peter Schaffer (disambiguation)
 Peter Shaffer, English playwright